The 1979 Indiana Hoosiers football team represented the Indiana Hoosiers in the 1979 Big Ten Conference football season. The Hoosiers played their home games at Memorial Stadium in Bloomington, Indiana. The team was coached by Lee Corso, in his seventh year as head coach of the Hoosiers. The Hoosiers participated in the Holiday Bowl, in a post-season matchup against BYU. The Hoosiers won, 38–37.

In the Old Oaken Bucket, the Hoosiers lost to Purdue by a score of 37–21.

Schedule

Roster

Game summaries

at Iowa

Source: 
    
    
    
    
    
    
    
    
    

On October 22, 2016, former Indiana University coach and current ESPN College Football analyst Lee Corso described the game on College Gameday. He said at halftime he told the Hoosiers (who were losing the game 26-3) to not bother coming out for the 2nd half unless they were prepared to win the game. Indiana would then go on to win the game 30-26.

Vanderbilt

Kentucky

Colorado

at Wisconsin

at Ohio State

at Michigan

Purdue

vs. BYU (Holiday Bowl)

Awards and honors
 Tim Clifford, Chicago Tribune Silver Football

1980 NFL draftees

References

Indiana
Indiana Hoosiers football seasons
Holiday Bowl champion seasons
Indiana Hoosiers football